Bubble Tape is a type of Hubba Bubba bubble gum produced by Wm. Wrigley Jr. Company, and introduced in 1988. It experienced its greatest popularity in the early 1990s, due to its unique packaging and direct marketing to preteen children ("it's six feet of bubble gum - for you, not them"—"them" referring to parents or just adults in general). At the peak of its popularity, over 1 million containers for Bubble Tape were being manufactured a week.

Bubble Tape comes in a small, round, plastic container similar in size to a hockey puck. This contains six feet (1.8 m) of gum wrapped in a spiral. The container functions much like a tape dispenser, although the top half can be removed or broken off.

Flavors
Most flavors are those available from the regular Hubba Bubba chewing gum line:
 Awesome Original
 Sour Green Apple
 Sour Watermelon
 Sour Blue Raspberry
 Cotton Candy
 Strapping Strawberry
 Juicy Fruit
 Gushing Grape
 Snappy Strawberry
 Triple Treat (also titled 'Triple Mix') – A mix of strawberry, blueberry, and watermelon
 Sugar Free Very Berry – A dentist-recommended version of Bubble Tape, a mix of grape and blue raspberry
 Candy Cane – A seasonal flavor
 Tangy Tropical
 Cola Party
 Groovy Watermelon

Also available in
 Mega Roll –  of Bubble Tape gum
 King Size –  of Bubble Tape gum

References

External links

Chewing gum
Wrigley Company brands
Products introduced in 1988